Horseshoe Mesa is a 5,246-foot-elevation mesa-summit located in the eastern Grand Canyon, in Coconino County of northern Arizona, US. It is located 1.5 mi south of the Colorado River and Granite Gorge; also 4 mi due-south of the Cape Royal overlook, and ~2.0 mi northwest from Grandview Point, of the East South Rim, Grand Canyon. The Grandview Trail descends to Horseshoe Mesa, then drops down to meet the (mostly horizontal trail, on the Tonto Platform), the Tonto Trail.

Horseshoe Mesa is shaped like a horseshoe, legs facing due-north towards the Colorado. The mesa is a mostly flat upper platform of Redwall Limestone, with its tall cliffs elevating the mesa. A peak of Supai Group is the prominence, at the mesa's south end.

External links
 Aerial view-(peak of reddish Supai Group, on the mesa ); Horseshoe Mesa, Mountainzone

References 

Mesas of Arizona
Grand Canyon National Park
Landforms of Coconino County, Arizona